The 2015–16 season was Hapoel Be'er Sheva's 67th season since its establishment, in May 1949. During the season, the team played in the Israeli Premier League, State Cup and Toto Cup domestically, and in the Europa League.

At the end of the season, the club had won the Israeli Premier League, its first league title since 1976 and its first major trophy since 1997.

Current squad
As of 23 June 2015

Transfers and loans

In

Out

Pre-season and friendlies

UEFA Europa League

Second qualifying round

Israel League Cup [Toto cup]

Group B

Hapoel Be'er Sheva
Hapoel Be'er Sheva F.C. seasons